Clifford Joseph Trahan (September 25, 1938 – September 3, 2016), better known by the stage names Johnny Rebel and Pee Wee Trahan, was an American singer, songwriter, and musician who performed songs that were supportive of white supremacy. He used the Johnny Rebel name for a series of recordings for J. D. "Jay" Miller's Reb Rebel label in the 1960s in response to the civil rights movement. The 12 songs exhibit racial hatred marketed as "subtle, rib-tickling satire". The songs frequently used the racial slur "nigger" and often voiced sympathy for racial segregation, the KKK, and the Confederacy.

After retiring in 2003, Trahan claimed that he "just did it for the money" and that he "didn't set out to spread hate or start trouble". He said, "At that time, there was a lot of resentment – whites toward blacks and blacks toward whites. So, everybody had their own feelings. Lots of people changed their feelings over the years. I basically changed my feelings over the years up to a point."

Early life

 Following his parents' divorce, he moved with his mother to Crowley, Louisiana, where he picked up an interest in music and received his first guitar as a gift at the age of 12. He graduated from Crowley High School in 1956.

Career
Trahan became close with record producer J. D. "Jay" Miller, a cousin of his, and recorded several country songs under the alias of Tommy Todd. Those songs never became commercial successes and Trahan moved to Nashville, Tennessee, to record with newly founded Todd Records. He became close with Murray Nash, a songwriter for country singer George Morgan, and recorded four songs with Todd Records, but the label folded in 1964.

Trahan then worked as a shipyard inspector in Mississippi before returning to Louisiana. Miller had founded Reb Rebel Records, which recorded segregationist music, and urged Trahan to record songs with the new label. Trahan obliged, recording under the alias of Johnny Rebel, a name Miller had selected. Miller produced the sessions and issued the recordings through Reb Rebel.

Trahan's first release—the fifth for the Reb Rebel label—was a 45 RPM single of "Lookin' for a Handout" and "Kajun Ku Klux Klan". He then recorded more singles for the label: "Nigger, Nigger", "Coon Town", "Who Likes a Nigger?", "Nigger Hatin' Me", "Still Looking for a Handout", "Some Niggers Never Die (They Just Smell That Way)", "Stay Away from Dixie", and "Move Them Niggers North".

Few of Trahan's songs concern topics other than race. These exceptions include "Keep a-Workin' Big Jim", about the efforts of Louisiana district attorney Jim Garrison to solve the assassination of John F. Kennedy, and "(Federal Aid Hell!) The Money Belongs to Us", a song critical of U.S. federal aid programs. Two of these songs were eventually issued in album format by Reb Rebel Records under the title For Segregationists Only.

In 1974, Trahan's song "Lâche pas la patate" (also known as "The Potato Song"), sung by Jimmy C. Newman, was released in Canada.

Johnny Rebel's songs found some popularity in some Southern juke joints, but never received radio airplay, and in time Trahan largely forgot about the venture. With the emergence of the Internet, Johnny Rebel gained newfound fame, and Trahan hired fan Brad Herman as his new manager in 2001. He then recorded and released a new song titled "Infidel Anthem", describing the "whipping" America should lay on Osama bin Laden following the September 11 attacks. Herman booked him on The Howard Stern Show, where he promoted the song. This led to increased interest in his music. Trahan eventually cut ties with Herman, but released two records in 2003.

CD design
A CD compilation of his works simply shows a hooded member of the Ku Klux Klan together with a depiction of the Confederate battle flag. The cover of the album It's the Attitude, Stupid! shows a hooded Klansman, holding an MP3 player with a Confederate flag texture, and wearing earphones.

Performances
According to Trahan, he only performed a Johnny Rebel song once. He said that he was performing in Kaplan, Louisiana, when someone in the crowd requested a Rebel song, and he obliged after making sure there were no black people in the audience.

Personal life
In a 2003 interview, Trahan claimed that he "just did it for the money" and that he "didn't set out to spread hate or start trouble". He said, "At that time, there was a lot of resentment – whites toward blacks and blacks toward whites. So, everybody had their own feelings. Lots of people changed their feelings over the years. I basically changed my feelings over the years up to a point." However, he did have an issue with reparations for slavery and said, "Blacks develop an attitude towards the whites, and they won't let it go. They won't let go of what happened. Why should we pay reparations for things that happened 200 years ago? I was run out of my country. [...] My ancestors were run out of Nova Scotia."

Death

Misattributions
Johnny Rebel is often misidentified as the pseudonym of country singer David Allan Coe, who achieved popularity during the 1970s and 1980s. The confusion stems in part from the song "Nigger Fucker", which appears on Coe's Underground Album. Coe has been quoted as saying, "Anyone that hears [Underground Album] and says I'm a racist is full of shit."

Some of Johnny Rebel's songs have also been misattributed to Johnny Horton, an American country singer who died in 1960. The confusion appears to stem from a song by Horton titled "Johnny Reb".

Impact
An Anti-Defamation League report noted that "since the 1960s, when racist country singer Johnny Rebel recorded songs such as 'N-- Hatin' Me,' [sic] more than 500 hate rock bands have formed worldwide".

Johnny Rebel's songs have been covered by other singers such as Big Reb and the German neo-Nazi band Landser, which covered his "Coon Town" under the title "Kreuzberg" in 1997.

In 2003, the website of white supremacist record label Resistance Records listed Johnny Rebel's Klassic Klan Kompositions album as its No. 2 seller, second only to the video game Ethnic Cleansing.

In 2005, the Johnny Rebel song "Some Niggers Never Die (They Just Smell That Way)" was used in Crispin Glover's film What Is It?

In 2010, the television series The Boondocks lampooned the music of Johnny Rebel in the episode "The Story of Jimmy Rebel".

Discography

Studio albums

Singles

References

1938 births
2016 deaths
People from Moss Bluff, Louisiana
Cajun people
American country singer-songwriters
American male singer-songwriters
People from Crowley, Louisiana
Singer-songwriters from Louisiana
Neo-Confederates
Race-related controversies in music